Gust may refer to:

People

Given name
 Gust Avrakotos (1938–2005), CIA case officer known for the arming of Afghanistan's Mujahideen against the Soviet invasion under Operation Cyclone
 Gust Hagberg (19th-century–20th-century)
 Gust Kundert (1913–2000), American politician
 Gust Lamesch (born 1911), Luxembourgian fencer
 Gust E. Lundberg (1920–1977), founder of the Sandy's fast-food restaurant chain
 Gust Stemmler (1899–1986), former Democratic member of the Pennsylvania House of Representatives
 Gust J. Swenning (1917–1942), American sailor who served in the United States Navy
 Gust Zarnas (1913–2000), college football All-American and professional football player
 Gust Graas (born 1924), Luxembourg businessman and painter

Surname
 Neil Gust, American musician known for co-founding Heatmiser with Elliott Smith in 1992
 Wolfgang Gust (born 1935), German journalist, historian, author and chief of heading for magazine Der Spiegel
 Ernie Gust (1888–1945), Early 20th century professional baseball player
 Reinhard Gust (born 1950), German rower, who competed for the SC Dynamo Berlin / Sportvereinigung (SV)
 Anne Gust (born 1958), American businesswoman and politician
 Ian Gust (born 1941), an Australian medical researcher, virologist, and former science administrator
 Werner Gust (1910–1979), highly decorated Oberst in the Wehrmacht during World War II

GUST
 TeX User Group Poland (:pl:Polska Grupa Użytkowników Systemu TeX) or their fonts distributed with Ghostscript
 Glasgow University Student Television
 Gulf University for Science and Technology, the first private university established in Kuwait
 Galway United Supporters Trust

Other uses
 Wind gust, a short blast of wind
 Outflow boundary or gust front, a storm-scale or mesoscale boundary separating thunderstorm-cooled air (outflow) from the surrounding air and marked by a wind shift
 Gust (game developer), a Japanese game developer and division of Koei Tecmo Games

See also
 Gusty (disambiguation)
Surnames from given names

simple:Gust